Mingarope is an obscure female deity. She features, along with Bund-jil, in Australian aboriginal creation narrative.

An 1879 work  records that "Mingarope having retired upon a natural occasion was highly pleased with the red color of her excrement, which she began to mould into the form of a man, and tickling  it, it showed signs of life and began to laugh."

References

Australian Aboriginal gods
Creator goddesses